Millerhill Marshalling Yard is a traction maintenance depot located in Millerhill, Scotland. The depot is situated on the Edinburgh and Hawick Railway and was near Millerhill station until it closed.

The depot code is MH.

History 
The depot used to have an allocation of First ScotRail Class 150 Sprinters until they were leased to other companies.

Present 
As of 2016, the depot's allocation consists of Class 37 and Class 66 locomotives and ScotRail Class 156 Sprinters and Class 158 Express Sprinters.

A £30 million stabling facility for Class 385 opened in 2018. In 2019 the Millerhill Recycling and Energy Recovery Centre opened on the former down yard.

References 

Railway depots in Scotland